Tethytheria is a clade of mammals that includes the sirenians and proboscideans, as well as the extinct order Embrithopoda.

Though there is strong anatomical and molecular support for the monophyly of Tethytheria, the interrelationships between the included taxa remain disputed. The tethytheres are united by several characters, including anteriorly facing orbits and more or less bilophodont cheek teeth (double transverse ridges on the crowns of the teeth). Proboscidea and Sirenia are linked together based on auditory characters in their petrosal bones, but this link may be a homoplasy. Desmostylians, traditionally considered tethytheres, have been tentatively assigned to Perissodactyla, along with the Early Eocene family Anthracobunidae, which was considered a sister group to Tethytheria.

Systematics

Classification
 Clade Tethytheria
 order †Embrithopoda
 †Phenacolophidae
 †Arsinoitheriidae
 order Sirenia
 †Prorastomidae
 †Protosirenidae (Dugongidae?)
 Dugongidae
 Trichechidae
 order Proboscidea
 †Phosphatheriidae (Numidotheriidae?)
 †Numidotheriidae
 †Moeritheriidae
 †Barytheriidae
 †Deinotheriidae
 †Palaeomastodontidae
 †Phiomiidae
 †Hemimastodontidae
 †Mammutidae
 †Gomphotheriidae
 Elephantidae

Notes

References

 
 

 
Mammal unranked clades